Ngāi Te Rangi or Ngāiterangi is a Māori iwi, based in Tauranga, New Zealand. Its rohe (tribal area) extends to Mayor Island / Tuhua and Bowentown in the north, to the Kaimai Range in the west, south of Te Puke and to Maketu in the east.

Ngāi Te Rangi is part of the Tauranga Moana iwi group, which also includes Ngāti Pūkenga and Ngāti Ranginui. The three iwi all consider Mauao (Mt Maunganui) sacred and share many things in common with one another. Collectively, the iwi are seeking compensation from the New Zealand Government for their losses from the New Zealand Wars but are yet to seek a settlement.

Hapū and marae

 Ngā Pōtiki hapū is based at Mangatawa Marae and Tamapahore wharenui at Kairua, and at Tahuwhakatiki/Romai marae and Rongomainohorangi wharenui at Welcome Bay. Ngā Pōtiki a Tamapahore Trust governs the hapū separately from the rest of the iwi.
 Ngāi Tamawhariua hapū is based at Te Rangihouhiri/Oruarahi marae and Te Rangihouhiri wharenui on Matakana Island, and Te Rere a Tukahia marae and Tamawhariua wharenui at Katikati.
 Ngāi Tauwhao hapū is based at Otāwhiwhi marae and Tamaoho wharenui at Bowentown, and Rangiwaea marae and Te Haka a Te Tupere wharenui on Rangiwaea Island.
 Ngāi Tukairangi hapū is based at Hungahungatoroa/Whakahinga marea and Tāpuiti wharenui at Matapihi, and Whareroa marae and Rauru ki Tahi wharenui at Mt Maunganui.
 Ngāti Tauaiti hapū is based at Kutaroa marae and Tauaiti wharenui at Matakana Island, and Opureora marae and Tuwhiwhia wharenui at Matakana Island.
 Ngāti Tapu hapū is based at Waikari marae and Tapukino wharenui at Matapihi. Ngāti Tapu Hapū Tribal Committee represents the hapū under the Resource Management Act over its areas of interest, at Matapihi and Tauranga City Central Business District. As of 2016 the trust is based in Tauranga nd its chairman is Wiremu Hiamoe.
 Ngāti He hapū is based at Opopoti marae and Wairakewa wharenui at Maungatapu. Ngāti He Kaitiaki o te Taiao represents the hapū under the Resource Management Act over its areas of interest, at Mt Maunganui, Te Tumu Kaituna and Otanewainuku.
 Ngāi Tuwhiwhia hapū is based at Opureora marae and Tuwhiwhia wharenui on Matakana Island.
 Ngāti Kuku hapū (sub-tribe) is based at Whareroa marae and Rauru ki Tahi wharenui at Mt Maunganui.

Governance

Te Runanga o Ngāi Te Rangi Iwi Trust is the mandated iwi organisation for Ngāi Te Rangi under the Māori Fisheries Act, an iwi aquaculture organisation under the Māori Commercial Aquaculture Claims Settlement Act, a Tūhono organisation, and represents Ngāi Te Rangi as an iwi authority under the Resource Management Act. It is a charitable trust, governed by one representative of each of the 11 marae. As of 2016, its chairman is Charlie Tawhiao, its chief executive officer is Brian Dickson, and it is based at Mt Maunganui.

Ngāi Te Rangi Settlement Trust is a governance entity for Ngāi Te Rangi recognised by the New Zealand Government following the iwi's settlement with the Crown on 14 December 2013. It is a common-law trust, governed by one trustee elected from 11 Hapū Community electorates, but not from Ngā Pōtiki.  As of 2016, the trust chairman is Charlie Tawhiao, the trust chief executive is Paora Stanley and the trust is based in Tauranga.

Ngā Pōtiki a Tamapahore Trust is a governance entity for Ngā Pōtiki hapū, which has also been recognised by the Government since the iwi's settlement with the Crown. It is also a common-law trust and is governed by five trustees elected by registered members of Ngā Pōtiki. As of 2016, its acting chairperson is Victoria Kingi and it is based in Papamoa.

The iwi has interests in the territories of Bay of Plenty Regional Council, Western Bay of Plenty District Council and Tauranga City Council.
<https://www.ngaiterangi.org.nz/trust-management></http://www.ngaiterangi.iwi.nz/contact.html>

Media

Moana Radio is the radio station of Ngāi Te Rangi and the other Tauranga Moana iwi. Moana previously operated youth-oriented urban contemporary Tahi FM between 2003 and late 2011.

Notable Ngāi Te Rangi 

 Hōri Ngātai, warrior, farmer and orator
 Matthew Tukaki, Chairman, the National Maori Authority, Executive Director of the New Zealand Maori Council, Chairman of the Ministry of Children Ministerial Advisory Board
 Teeks, musician
 Pene Taka Tuaia, warrior, military engineer and land protester
 Stan Walker, musician, actor and personality

References

External links
 Official website of Te Rūnanga o Ngāi Te Rangi Iwi